Villafranca is a town in the autonomous community of Navarra, in Spain.

Villafranca or Vilafranca may also refer to:

Italy
Villafranca d'Asti, in the province of Asti
Villafranca di Verona, in the province of Verona
Villafranca in Lunigiana, in the province of Massa-Carrara
Villafranca Padovana, in the province of Padua
Villafranca Piemonte, in the province of Turin
Villafranca Sicula, in the province of Agrigento
Villafranca Tirrena, in the province of Messina

Spain
Vilafranca, in the autonomous community of Valencia
Vilafranca de Bonany, in the autonomous community of Balearic Islands
Vilafranca del Penedès, in the autonomous community of Catalunya
Villafranca de Córdoba, in the autonomous community of Andalusia
Villafranca de Duero, in the autonomous community of Castile and León
Villafranca de Ebro, in the autonomous community of Aragon
Villafranca de la Sierra, in the autonomous community of Castile and León
Villafranca de los Barros, in the autonomous community of Estremadura
Villafranca de los Caballeros, in the autonomous community of Castile-La Mancha
Villafranca del Bierzo, in the autonomous community of Castile and León
Villafranca del Campo, in the autonomous community of Aragon
Villafranca de Ordicia, currently officially named Ordizia, in the autonomous community of Basque Country
Villafranca Montes de Oca, in the autonomous community of Castile and León

Paraguay
 Villa Franca, a village in the Ñeembucú department of Paraguay

Portugal
Vila Franca de Xira, Lisbon
Vila Franca do Campo, Azores

See also 
 Villafranca (surname)
 Villafranca (film), a 1934 Italian historical drama film
 Counts of Villafranca
 Freiburg
 Treaty of Villafranca
 Villefranche (disambiguation)
 Francavilla (disambiguation)